Giacomo Nini was a Roman Catholic prelate who served as Bishop of Potenza (1506–1521).

Biography
On 7 Aug 1506, Giacomo Nini was appointed by Pope Julius II as Bishop of Potenza. He served as Bishop of Potenza until his resignation in 1521.

References

External links and additional sources
 (for Chronology of Bishops) 
 (for Chronology of Bishops)  

16th-century Italian Roman Catholic bishops
Bishops appointed by Pope Julius II